Deniz Cicek (born 19 October 1992) is a footballer who plays as a midfielder for TSV Havelse. Born in Germany, he is of Turkish descent.

Career
Cicek made his professional debut for TSV Havelse in the 3. Liga on 2 October 2021 against 1. FC Kaiserslautern.

References

External links
 
 
 
 

1992 births
Living people
People from Hanover
German people of Turkish descent
Footballers from Lower Saxony
German footballers
Turkish footballers
Association football midfielders
TSV Havelse players
Sportfreunde Lotte players
3. Liga players
Regionalliga players